Beftamun  is a Syrian village located in Muhambal Nahiyah in Ariha District, Idlib.  According to the Syria Central Bureau of Statistics (CBS), Beftamun had a population of 1058 in the 2004 census.

References 

Populated places in Ariha District
Villages in Idlib Governorate